Jang Bong-mun (born 25 August 1954) is a North Korean boxer. He competed in the men's middleweight event at the 1980 Summer Olympics.

References

External links
 

1954 births
Living people
North Korean male boxers
Olympic boxers of North Korea
Boxers at the 1980 Summer Olympics
Place of birth missing (living people)
Asian Games medalists in boxing
Boxers at the 1974 Asian Games
Boxers at the 1978 Asian Games
Asian Games silver medalists for North Korea
Medalists at the 1978 Asian Games
Middleweight boxers
20th-century North Korean people